Lambeth North is a London Underground station in the district of Lambeth, at the junction of Westminster Bridge Road and Baylis Road. It is on the Bakerloo line, between Elephant & Castle and Waterloo, and is in Travelcard Zone 1. It is located at 110 Westminster Bridge Road, and is the nearest tube station to the Imperial War Museum. As of 2017 it is the least-used Underground station in Zone 1.

History
Designed by Leslie Green, the station was opened by the Baker Street & Waterloo Railway on 10 March 1906, with the name Kennington Road. It served as the temporary southern terminus of the line until 5 August 1906, when Elephant & Castle station was opened. The station's name was changed to Westminster Bridge Road in July 1906 and it was again renamed, to Lambeth North, in April 1917.

At 03:56 on 16 January 1941, a German "Satan" 1800 kg general-purpose bomb hit a hostel at nearby 92 Westminster Bridge Road. The shock wave severely damaged the southbound platform tunnel injuring 28 people sheltering there, one of whom died in hospital 15 days later. Traffic through the station resumed after 95 days.

The station closed for maintenance works in July 2016, and reopened in February 2017.

Layout
There are two tracks in separate tunnels. Immediately north of the station is a crossover enabling trains to terminate at both platforms. This is necessary for trains that are stabled at the London Road Depot, which can be seen on St George's Street and connects with the Bakerloo line north of the station.

Services

The typical service pattern in trains per hour (tph) is:
 6tph to Harrow & Wealdstone via Queens Park & Stonebridge Park (Northbound)
 3tph to Stonebridge Park via Queens Park (Northbound)
 5tph to Queens Park (Northbound)
 14tph to Elephant and Castle (Southbound)

Connections
London Buses routes 12, 53, 59, 148, 159, 453 and C10 and night route N109 serve the station.

References

External links

 London Transport Museum Photographic Archive
 
 

Bakerloo line stations
Tube stations in the London Borough of Lambeth
History of the London Borough of Lambeth
Former Baker Street and Waterloo Railway stations
Railway stations in Great Britain opened in 1906
Leslie Green railway stations